Spair Airlines Flight 3601 (PAR-3601) was a cargo flight between Ekaterinburg, Russia, and Malta International Airport, Malta. On the 19 August 1996 the aircraft crashed in a corn field, 1,500 meters (4,921 feet) northeast of Belgrade Nikola Tesla Airport's runway in Yugoslavia.

Aircraft
The aircraft was a 12-year-old Ilyushin Il-76T with tail number RA-76513.

Flight chronology
Flight 3601 departed from Ekaterinburg on August 18, 1996. The Il-76T landed at Belgrade Nikola Tesla Airport for refueling and a routine check.

Flight 3601 tried to take off around 23:00, but when the engines were started, all electrical systems failed. The electrical malfunction was repaired and the plane took off at 00:10 on August 19, 1996 heading for Malta. Although the malfunction had been repaired, the crew had improperly configured their electrical systems, resulting in those systems being fed solely off the aircraft's batteries. About 15 minutes after takeoff, as Flight 3601 reached Valjevo, Yugoslavia, the batteries began to drain completely. Pilot Vladimir Starikov contacted Belgrade air traffic control and said the plane was again having electrical system problems; that was the last contact air traffic control had with Flight 3601. The crew made several attempts to conduct an emergency landing at Belgrade, unsuccessful due to night and difficult weather conditions. During one of these attempts the aircraft crashed, killing all 8 crew and 3 passengers.

Flight 3601 appeared over Belgrade about one hour after take off. Many Belgrade residents saw the plane fly over the city and observed that there were no lights active on the aircraft. The weather over Belgrade was very bad that night with heavy clouds. Since there were no electricity aboard the aircraft, the only way to find the runway was by sight.

At about 01:30, Flight 3601 circled central Belgrade at a very low altitude; witnesses said that the plane was seen flying very low over New Belgrade. At 03:14, the flight crew tried to land, first making a 180-degree turn and then aiming for Runway 12 on a course of 121 degrees.

The aircraft plummeted into a corn field as it attempted an emergency landing at Surcin International Airport, exploding and killing the Russian crew of 11. According to The New York Times, the aircraft was illegally carrying weapons for Libya.

References

External links

Aviation accidents and incidents in 1996
Aviation accidents and incidents in Serbia
Aviation accidents and incidents in Yugoslavia
Accidents and incidents involving the Ilyushin Il-76
Spair Airlines accidents and incidents
1996 in Serbia
August 1996 events in Europe
Accidents and incidents involving cargo aircraft
1996 disasters in Serbia